El grito continua is a 2010 sculpture by Camilo Ramírez, installed in Tlaquepaque, in the Mexican state of Jalisco.

References

External links

 

2010 establishments in Mexico
2010 sculptures
Outdoor sculptures in Jalisco
Sculptures of men in Mexico
Sculptures of women in Mexico
Statues in Jalisco
Tlaquepaque